is a 2004 kaiju film directed by Ryuhei Kitamura, written by Isao Kiriyama and Wataru Mimura, and produced by Shogo Tomiyama. An international co-production between Japan, Australia, the United States, and China, the film was produced by Toho Studios, CP International, Zazou Productions, and Napalm Films. It is the 29th film in the Godzilla franchise, the sixth and final film in the franchise's Millennium series and the 28th Godzilla film produced by Toho.
The film stars Masahiro Matsuoka, Rei Kikukawa, Don Frye, Maki Mizuno, Kazuki Kitamura, Kane Kosugi, Kumi Mizuno, Kenji Sahara, Masami Nagasawa, Chihiro Otsuka, Shigeru Izumiya, Masakatsu Funaki, Masato Ibu, Jun Kunimura, and Akira Takarada. In the film, when a mysterious race of aliens known as the Xiliens arrive on Earth, the Earth Defense Force find themselves locked in battle with various monsters attacking cities around the world, leading them to revive the only chance to save their planet: Godzilla.

The film coincided with the 50th anniversary of the franchise, and as such, the film features a variety of actors and kaiju from previous films. Godzilla: Final Wars premiered on November 29, 2004 in Los Angeles, California, and was released theatrically in Japan on December 4, 2004. Before the world premiere, Godzilla received a star on the Hollywood Walk of Fame.

Plot
Over the course of the 20th century, environmental disasters cause the appearance of giant monsters and superhumans, dubbed "mutants", who are then recruited into the Earth Defense Force (EDF) to battle the monsters. During a battle in Antarctica with the original Gotengo, the monster Godzilla is entrapped under ice by a cave-in caused by a series of missiles fired off from the submarine. Many years later, an upgraded Gotengo, now commanded by Captain Douglas Gordon, battles and destroys Manda in the English Channel off the coast of Normandy, but the ship is wrecked in the process and Gordon is suspended from the EDF.

Mutant soldier Shinichi Ozaki is tasked with guarding a U.N. biologist, Dr. Miyuki Otonashi, who is sent to study a mummified monster. They are teleported to Infant Island where they encounter the Shobijin, fairies of Mothra, who reveal the mummified monster as Gigan, an alien cyborg sent to destroy the Earth ten thousand years earlier, who was ultimately defeated by Mothra. They warn that a battle between good and evil will happen soon and that Ozaki must choose a side. Suddenly, giant monsters attack several major cities: Rodan attacks New York City, Anguirus attacks Shanghai, Zilla attacks Sydney, King Caesar attacks Okinawa, Kamacuras attacks Paris, Kumonga attacks Monument Valley in Arizona, Ebirah attacks Tokai, and Hedorah attacks an unknown location. The EDF engages the creatures, until the monsters mysteriously vanish as an alien mothership appears over Tokyo. The aliens, named Xiliens, claim that they eliminated the monsters as a gesture of goodwill, and warn Earth's leaders that an incoming planet called "Gorath" will soon impact the Earth, offering their help to destroy it. A peace pact is signed between humanity and the Xiliens. Meanwhile, Minilla, Godzilla's son, is found in the forests of Japan by Kenta Taguchi and his grandfather Samon Taguchi.

Distrusting the Xiliens, Ozaki, Miyuki, and Miyuki's sister Anna discover that the Gorath shown by the Xiliens is actually a hologram and that the aliens have replaced several members of the EDF with duplicates. After the Xiliens are exposed with help from Gordon and the other mutants, the Xiliens' Controller (who called himself "X" during an interview on a radio show) kills his superior to assume command, revealing the plan to use humans as a food source while taking control of all the mutants except for Ozaki through a property in their DNA known as "M-base". X also has the monsters placed under his control through M-base in their DNA and awakens Gigan to wipe out the EDF. The group escapes in a repaired Gotengo, although Gigan pursues them.  Gordon convinces them to travel to Antarctica to release Godzilla, who is immune to Xilien control thanks to his lack of M-base and easily destroys Gigan. The Gotengo then guides Godzilla into a series of battles with the other monsters: he defeats Zilla, Kumonga,  Kamacuras, Rodan, King Caesar, Anguirus, Ebirah, and Hedorah, before the Gotengo leads him into Tokyo to engage the Xiliens. After penetrating the mothership, the humans are captured and brought before X as he summons Gorath to Earth. Godzilla destroys Gorath just before it crashes, but this unleashes Monster X and the two monsters battle. An upgraded Gigan joins Monster X but is intercepted by Mothra, who is gravely wounded while managing to destroy the cyborg.

In the Xilien ship, X reveals that both he and Ozaki are superior beings known as "Keizers", powerful beings distinct from regular mutants born on rare occasions when human DNA and M-base are combined, before directly taking control of Ozaki to turn him against the group. A fight breaks out, and X loses control of Ozaki due to the Shobijins' blessing. Ozaki unlocks his true power and defeats X, who triggers the ship's self-destruct as the group falls back to the Gotengo moments before the mothership explodes. Godzilla and Monster X continue their battle, but a dying X transfers his Keizer energy to Monster X, enabling it to transform into its final form, Keizer Ghidorah. Godzilla is almost defeated by Keizer Ghidorah, but Ozaki transfers some of his own Keizer energy to Godzilla, giving him the strength to gain the upper hand and emerge victorious. Godzilla then shoots down the Gotengo, before turning his ire towards its crew after they leave the damaged vessel. Fortunately, Minilla shows up at the scene and convinces Godzilla not to kill the humans. The humans watch as Godzilla and Minilla return to the ocean.

Cast

Production

Ryuhei Kitamura accepted the offer to direct the film due to being unsatisfied with the Godzilla films of the 1980s, 1990s, and 2000s, stating, "I loved the Godzilla movies back in the ’70s, but not so much the ones released in the 1980s and ’90s. Godzilla movies back in the ’70s were never just monster movies, there were always messages and themes that reflected the time and world within which they were made, and they combined this so well with straight-out entertainment. They lost that touch in the ’80s".

Kitamura has compared Godzilla: Final Wars to that of a musician's "Best of" album, stating "We picked lots and lots of the best elements from the past and combined it in a new way. It's what I love about Godzilla and what I don't love about recent Godzilla movies".

Like previous Godzilla films, Godzilla: Final Wars makes extensive use of practical effects rather than CGI. The special effects were directed and supervised by Eiichi Asada, who also directed the special effects for Godzilla: Tokyo S.O.S. Commenting on the special effects, Kitamura stated at the film's world premiere in Hollywood, "We stick to the special effects. That’s what we've been doing for 50 years. And that’s why Hollywood doesn’t do it. So on the first meeting, I told everybody that we stick to the special effects, and the live action instead of CGI. So it’s a CGI-monster-Hollywood Godzilla versus our man-made live-action monsters."

Filming included on-location shooting in New York City and Sydney, Australia. Scenes were also filmed in various locations across Japan, including Fukushima, Kobe, and Toho Studios in Tokyo.

Music

The film's score was composed by Keith Emerson, Nobuhiko Morino, and Daisuke Yano. Emerson was offered the job by Kitamura, who was attending Emerson's Japanese concerts at the time. Emerson's main concern was the potential lack of time before going on tour. Emerson was only given two weeks to write the score and ended up writing more music than what was used in the film. The film featured the track We're All to Blame by Sum 41 during the battle between Godzilla and Zilla. The band received top billing in the opening credits.

Release
Godzilla: Final Wars was distributed theatrically by Toho in Japan on November 29, 2004. It was released theatrically in the United States on November 4, 2004 and then released to video on December 13, 2005.

Critical response
The film received fairly positive reviews, especially in Japan, but more divided reactions abroad.
Film review aggregator website Rotten Tomatoes gave the film a 50% rating, based on 12 reviews with a total score of 5.8/10.

Steve Biodrowski of Cinefantastique called the film "utterly fantastic" and "a rush of explosive excitement." Jim Agnew of Film Threat gave the film four and a half stars out of five, saying "the good news for kaiju fans is that Godzilla: Final Wars is a kick-ass giant monster flick." Drew McWeeny of Ain't It Cool News remarked, "Godzilla: Final Wars earns a special place in my heart. It's fun. Pure lunatic fun, every frame." Sean Axmaker of Static Multimedia said, "Directed by a true fan of the old school, it's lusciously, knowingly, lovingly cheesy." Craig Blamer of the Chico News & Review called the film "a giddy and fast-paced celebration of the big guy."

Conversely, David Nusair of Reel Film gave the film one and a half stars out of five, saying that "the battles are admittedly quite entertaining" but felt that director Ryuhei Kitamura "is absolutely the wrong choice for the material." David Cornelius of eFilmCritic gave the film two stars out of five, calling it "the dullest, weakest Godzilla movie I've seen in a long, long time." Ty Burr of the Boston Globe gave the film one and a half stars out of five, saying it focused too much on action and not enough on story, and calling it "35 minutes longer than is necessary."

Among kaiju-related websites, J.L. Carrozza of Toho Kingdom "absolutely love[d]" Final Wars, saying "[it's] no masterpiece, but it is such insane fun that quite frankly it's hard not to adore it." Mike Bogue of American Kaiju said "the film is flawed, but nonetheless entertaining," saying there are "too many [Matrix-style] battles" but that the film "makes excellent use of its monsters" and "Kitamura keeps things moving at a brisk pace." Japan Hero criticized the "[lack of] character development" but concluded that Final Wars is "a very entertaining movie," saying that "Kitamura did a wonderful job making it an interesting and great looking film worthy of being the final [Godzilla] movie."

Stomp Tokyo said "the monster scenes are generally well done" but criticized the film's "incoherence," saying: "It's a shame that Kitamaura couldn't choose a tone for the film, instead shifting the movie's mood wildly from scene to scene." Lenny Taguchi of Monster Zero criticized Keith Emerson's soundtrack but gave Final Wars an overall favorable review, calling it a "fun and good" movie that "tries many things, and generally succeeds at almost all of them."

Director Kitamura commented at the film's world premiere that the reason why he agreed to direct the film was because he wanted to update Godzilla and recapture the same spirit seen in the later Godzilla films from the Showa era. He wanted to incorporate the same speed and power seen in films like Godzilla vs. Mechagodzilla, which he believed was lost somewhere within the series, stating, "The Godzilla series had lost that kind of taste. I think that back in the '70s Godzilla movies had more power and speed. He was very fast and he was very strong. So in my Godzilla, you know, less dialogue and more action. That’s more fun than watching people discuss what we should do about Godzilla. As a Godzilla fan I want to see Godzilla punching and kicking, beating up all the other monsters instead of somebody talking again, you know, discussing the operation. That's what I wanted to do is to revive that, but not in the same way, I have to update. This is the updated version of '60 & 70s, crazy, monster movies. I hope that the Americans will not modify the Japanese version too much."

Awards

Home media

Sony Pictures Home Entertainment
 Released: December 13, 2005
 Aspect Ratio: Widescreen (2.40:1) Anamorphic
 Sound: Japanese (Dolby Digital 5.1) English (Dolby Digital 5.1)
 Subtitles: English and French
 Supplements: Behind-the-Scenes Featurette (comparison of B-roll footage to finished film)(17:53 min); Trailers for Final Fantasy VII Advent Children, Steamboy, Dust to Glory, MirrorMask, and Madison
 Region 1
 MPAA Rating: Rated PG-13 for Intense Sequences of Violence.

Sony – Blu-ray (Toho Godzilla Collection) 
 Released: May 6, 2014
 Picture: 2.40:1 (MPEG-4 AVC) [1080P]
 Sound: Japanese and English (DTS-HD Master Audio 5.1)
 Subtitles: English, English SDH, and French
 Extras:
 Godzilla: B-Roll to Film (SD, Japanese DD 2.0, English subtitles, 17:54)
 Theatrical Trailer (Japanese DD 2.0, English subtitles, 2:11, HD)
 Teaser 1 (Japanese DD 2.0, English subtitles, 0:41, HD)
 Teaser 2 (Japanese DD 2.0, English subtitles, 0:41, HD)
 Teaser 3 (Japanese DD 2.0, English subtitles, 0:42, HD)
 Notes: This is a 2-Disc double feature with Godzilla: Tokyo SOS''.

References

Bibliography

External links
 
 
 
 Official Site in Japanese
 

2004 films
2004 science fiction films
2000s Japanese-language films
2000s monster movies
Alien invasions in films
American monster movies
American multilingual films
American martial arts films
American science fiction action films
American sequel films
Apocalyptic films
Australian monster movies
Australian multilingual films
Australian science fiction action films
Australian sequel films
Cantonese-language films
Chinese science fiction action films
Chinese sequel films
Films scored by Keith Emerson
Films about extraterrestrial life
Films about dragons
Films about spiders
Films directed by Ryuhei Kitamura
Films set in Antarctica
Films set in Arizona
Films set in Asia
Films set in Egypt
Films set in Japan
Films set in Kanagawa Prefecture
Japanese films set in New York City
Films set in Okinawa Prefecture
Films set in Papua New Guinea
Films set in Paris
Films set in Shanghai
Films set in Shizuoka Prefecture
Films set in Sydney
Films set in Tokyo
Films set in Vancouver
Films set in Yamanashi Prefecture
Films set in the Pacific Ocean
Films set on fictional islands
Films shot in Fukushima Prefecture
Films shot in Japan
Films shot in Kobe
Films shot in New York City
Films shot in Paris
Films shot in Sydney
Films shot in Tokyo
Godzilla films
Japanese science fiction action films
Japanese martial arts films
Japanese multilingual films
Japanese sequel films
Giant monster films
Kaiju films
Mothra
Pterosaurs in fiction
Reboot films
Submarine films
Toho films
Australian action adventure films
2004 martial arts films
Films with screenplays by Wataru Mimura
Films about father–son relationships
2000s English-language films
2000s American films
2000s Japanese films
Foreign films set in the United States